Afton is a town in northeast Oklahoma in Ottawa County, Oklahoma, United States.  The population was 1,049 as of the 2010 census, with population growth stemming from the near abandonment of nearby towns of Cardin and Picher because of ground contamination sites by local mining quarries. The town may have been named for the Scottish River Afton.

History
Afton developed in this part of the Cherokee Nation in Indian Territory after the Atlantic and Pacific Railroad Company (later the St. Louis and San Francisco Railway, or Frisco) built tracks through the area to Vinita in 1871. According to Oklahoma historian George Shirk, a Scottish railroad surveyor, Anton Aires, named the town Afton after his daughter. Others have claimed the name comes from Robert Burns's poem, "Flow Gently Sweet Afton." Both Afton Aires' name and the Burns'poem honor the River Afton in Scotland.

A post office was established in Afton during 1886. The 1900 census showed a population of 606. In 1901, the Kansas City, Fort Scott and Memphis Railroad, which soon became part of the Frisco system, constructed another line through the town, creating a shorter route to Kansas City, and causing another spurt of population growth. The town became a Frisco division point and shipping center for the surrounding agricultural area.{{efn/Agriculture mainly featured wheat, corn, hay and livestock.}} In 1910, Afton's population was 1,276; the town had two schools, a waterworks, two hotels, two banks, a brick and tile plant, a creamery, a newspaper, mills and grain elevators. The population peaked at 1,518 in 1920, but a depression after World War I caused a drop to 1,219 in 1930.

Geography
Afton is located at  (36.691845, -94.964024).

Originally a farming and railroad community, Afton is located on the historic Route 66. Route 66 was bypassed by I-44 in 1957. Businesses which formerly served US 66 travellers in the town's heyday included the Palmer Hotel, Rogers’ Motel, Rest Haven Motel, Green Acres Motel and Avon Motor Court, Baker's Cafe, Clint's Cafe, Smith Store and Barrett's Food Store, Mack's Place and Fred's 66 Bar.

There was a museum in a former D-X filling station, built in 1937 and restored in 1999 to house Packard and U.S. Route 66 memorabilia.  The museum was closed and the building is now vacant.  The Palmer Hotel building burned down in 2019.

Demographics

Afton is part of the Joplin-Miami, MO-OK metropolitan area.

As of the census of 2010, there were 1,049 people living in the town. The population density was 620 people per square mile (240/km). The racial makeup of the town was 77.46% White, 0.09% African American, 14.58% Native American, 0.09% Asian, and 7.78% from two or more races. Hispanic or Latino of any race were 1.70% of the population.

There were 441 households, out of which 33.3% had children under the age of 18 living with them, 51.9% were married couples living together, 10.9% had a female householder with no husband present, and 31.5% were non-families. 29.7% of all households were made up of individuals, and 15.6% had someone living alone who was 65 years of age or older. The average household size was 2.54 and the average family size was 3.11.

In the town, the population was spread out, with 29.5% under the age of 18, 7.6% from 18 to 24, 25.7% from 25 to 44, 20.2% from 45 to 64, and 17.0% who were 65 years of age or older. The median age was 36 years. For every 100 females, there were 94.8 males. For every 100 females age 18 and over, there were 93.6 males.

The median income for a household in the town was $21,964, and the median income for a family was $28,036. Males had a median income of $22,361 versus $16,964 for females. The per capita income for the town was $11,032. About 15.9% of families and 21.0% of the population were below the poverty line, including 32.6% of those under age 18 and 5.1% of those age 65 or over.

Education
Afton is served by the Afton Independent School District.

Northeast Tech operates one of its four campuses at 19901 S. Hwy 69; the Afton Campus serves approximately 500 students.  

In 2017, the Afton High School Football team won the Class A State Trophy for the first time in school history.

Culture
 The Darryl Starbird National Rod and Custom Hall of Fame Museum hosts an anniversary celebration in Afton, every June.

Transportation

Highways
Afton sits at the junction of one Interstate Highway and three US Highways. A fourth US Highway previously ran through the area.

 (former)

Railroads
Burlington Northern & Santa Fe (BNSF) runs through Afton on the town's north side as it roughly parallels 1st Street. Afton has two major subdivisions that operate through the town. The BNSF Cherokee Subdivision begins in Springfield, Missouri and ends at the BNSF Cherokee Yard in the city of Tulsa,  Oklahoma. The BNSF Afton Subdivision begins at the wye to the northeast of town and runs north to just south of Fort Scott, Kansas, where it merges with, and becomes, the BNSF Fort Scott Subdivision into Kansas City, Missouri.

National Register of Historic Places
 Cities Service Station
 Horse Creek Bridge was modernized for the original bridge built in the 1930s was no longer able to bear the traffic.

References

External links

 Afton information, photos and videos on TravelOK.com Official travel and tourism website for the State of Oklahoma
 "Afton", Encyclopedia of Oklahoma History and Culture

Towns in Ottawa County, Oklahoma
Towns in Oklahoma
Populated places established in 1871
1871 establishments in Indian Territory